Mário de Ascenção Palmério (1 March 1916 – 24 September 1996) was a Brazilian politician and writer, who was born in Monte Carmelo, Minas Gerais. He died at Uberaba, Minas Gerais, in 1996.

Bibliography 
Vila dos confins, novel (1956);
Chapadão do bugre, novel (1965)
O morro das sete voltas, novel
Seleta... (1974)

1916 births
1996 deaths
Brazilian male novelists
20th-century Brazilian novelists
20th-century Brazilian male writers